This is a list of tributaries of the Danube by order of entrance.

The Danube is Europe's second-longest river.

The Danube flows through—or forms a part of the borders of—ten countries: Germany, Austria, Slovakia, Hungary, Croatia, Serbia, Bulgaria, Romania, Moldova, and Ukraine; in addition, the drainage basin includes parts of nine more countries: Poland, Switzerland, Italy, Czech Republic, Slovenia, Bosnia and Herzegovina, Montenegro, North Macedonia and Albania.

See also
 International Commission for the Protection of the Danube River

Notes

References 

 Mala Prosvetina Enciklopedija, Third edition (1985); Prosveta-Beograd; 
 Jovan Đ. Marković (1990): Enciklopedijski geografski leksikon Jugoslavije; Svjetlost-Sarajevo; 
 Atlas svijeta, Fifth edition (1974); Jugoslavenski leksikografski zavod-Zagreb;
 Donaukommission - Die Donau von Kelheim bis Sulina 

Danube

Danube